Crime and Punishment (Spanish:Crimen y castigo) is a 1951 Mexican film directed by Fernando de Fuentes and starring Roberto Cañedo, Lilia Prado and Carlos López Moctezuma.

It is an adaptation of Fyodor Dostoevsky's 1866 novel Crime and Punishment, with the setting updated to a contemporary Mexico City. The film's sets were designed by the art director Javier Torres Torija.

Cast
 Roberto Cañedo as Ramón Bernal  
 Lilia Prado as Sonia  
 Carlos López Moctezuma as Delegado Porfirio Marín  
 Luis Beristáin as Carlos  
 Elda Peralta as María  
 Fanny Schiller as Mamá de Ramón  
 Lupe del Castillo as Doña Lorenza 
 Rodolfo Calvo as Empleado delegación  
 Enrique Carrillo as Cargador  
 Enedina Díaz de León as Mujer busca empleo  
 José Escanero as Portero  
 Rafael Estrada as Roldan  
 Juan Pulido as Pedro Luquin  
 Salvador Quiroz as Cantinero  
 Polo Ramos as Nicolás  
 Nicolasito Rodriguez as Hijo de Nacho  
 Humberto Rodríguez as Doctor  
 Nicolás Rodríguez as Don Nacho  
 Aurora Ruiz as Anastasia  
 Ramón Sánchez as Cargador  
 Salvador Sánchez

External links
 

1951 films
1951 drama films
Mexican drama films
1950s Spanish-language films
Films directed by Fernando de Fuentes
Films based on Crime and Punishment
Mexican black-and-white films
1950s Mexican films